The 2002 FedEx Championship Series season, the twenty-fourth in the CART era of U.S. open-wheel racing, consisted of 19 races,  beginning in Monterrey, Mexico on March 10 and concluding in Mexico City, Mexico on November 17. The FedEx Championship Series Drivers' Champion was  Cristiano da Matta.  Rookie of the Year was Mario Domínguez.

Sports television channel ESPN dropped CART coverage for the 2002 season. CBS and Speed Channel took its place for two seasons.

Drivers and teams 
Bridgestone became the exclusive tire supplier for CART, replacing Firestone, an association that would continue until the final Champ Car season in 2007.  The 2002 season was the last to feature multiple engine manufacturers.

The following teams and drivers competed in the 2002 CART Championship Series season.

Team changes 
The biggest change to the team lineup in the 2002 CART season was the defection of Team Penske to the rival Indy Racing League. The departure of Team Penske, a CART stalwart from its earliest days, was an early sign of a major shift in the CART-IRL rivalry.  Several other major CART powers would follow Penske to the IRL for the 2003 season.  Target Chip Ganassi Racing and Mo Nunn Racing both set up separate IRL teams in 2002, but continued to compete in CART for the time being, though Mo Nunn downsized his team to a single car.  They would be among the teams to leave CART for the IRL in 2003. Blair Racing also left CART for IRL.  Patrick Racing downsized their effort to a single car, while Forsythe Racing shut down their third car driven by Bryan Herta in 2001 for lack of sponsorship.

Driver changes 
1996 series champion Jimmy Vasser, one of two former champions in the 2002 field (the other being Michael Andretti), left Patrick Racing for Team Rahal.  Joining him at Rahal was Michel Jourdain Jr. who left Herdez Competition.  Rahal's 2001 drivers, Kenny Bräck and Max Papis moved to Target Chip Ganassi Racing and Sigma Autosport.  Papis took the seat previously occupied by Oriol Servià, who replaced the retiring Maurício Gugelmin at PWR Championship Racing.  The 2002 season started with two rookies.  2001 Dayton Indy Lights champion Townsend Bell led a one car effort at Patrick Racing.  Mario Domínguez signed on for another single car effort with Herdez Competition.

In-season changes 
 Lack of sponsorship led to the shutdown of PWR Championship Racing after the third race in Motegi, Japan.  Scott Dixon landed in a third car at Target Chip Ganassi Racing, while Oriol Servià was sidelined for the time being.
 Having already dropped the Bettenhausen name from its team name with the conclusion of the 2001 season, Herdez Competition changed their car number from 16 to 55 beginning with the fifth round at Mazda Raceway Laguna Seca.  #16 had long been associated with Tony Bettenhausen Jr. and his race team.
 The fifth race at Laguna Seca was the last appearance for Sigma Autosport, which, like PWR earlier in the season, found their sponsorship well run dry, leaving Max Papis without a ride.
 A run of disappointing performances and a two probation sanctions from CART Chief Steward Wally Dallenbach Sr. led to the firing of Townsend Bell from Patrick Racing after the ninth round at Cleveland.  Oriol Servià drove the #20 car for the remainder of the season.
 Adrián Fernández fractured his hip in a crash in the tenth race at Vancouver and sat out the following race at Mid-Ohio.  Max Papis substituted for him.
 Dale Coyne helped put together what was described as an "all-England" team named Team St. George for a one shot effort for the fifteenth race at Rockingham, England.  Darren Manning was chosen to be the driver.  The team used Coyne's traditional #19 car.
 After clinching the season championship by winning the sixteenth race in Miami Cristiano da Matta ran with #1 on his car for the rest of the season.
 Adrian Fernández was involved in a crash in the seventeenth race at Surfer's Paradise, Australia and suffered two thoracic fractures, which forced him to sit out the final two races of the season.  Max Papis sat in for him again at Fontana and Luis Díaz substituted at Mexico City.
 Dale Coyne Racing reappeared under its own name and ran André Lotterer at the final race of the season at Mexico City.

Rule changes 
The biggest rule change was the implementation of mandatory pit windows. 
A maximum pit window was established; meaning each car go no further than a specified number of laps without pitting. As a result, there were a minimum number of pit stops per race.
To count as a mandatory stop, all 4 tires had to be changed. Adding fuel on a pit stop was officially optional to encourage teams to go off sequence with an early stop.
Failure to pit within the specified number of laps resulted in a drive-through penalty in addition to the mandatory stop.
The rule closing pit road when a full course caution flag was displayed was eliminated to prevent teams from missing their window due to a caution flag coming out.
All mandated pit stops must be completed before the white flag lap.
The goal of the rule was to eliminate fuel economy runs and allow drivers to run as hard as they could the entire run as they had all the fuel needed to do so. However, teams ended up changing their strategy to conserve fuel so they could release the car from their pit stops as soon as the tire changes were complete. This led to a series of incidents where cars were being released back on track before the tire changes were complete and loose wheels coming off cars once back on track. To deter this CART instituted a mid-season 1-lap penalty and $5,000 fine for any car losing a wheel after a pit stop in addition to the time lost recovering the car to remount the tire.
Traction control was formally legalized after CART officials determined they could not successfully enforce a ban.
After several controversies with changing turbo boost in recent years, CART and its engine manufacturers agreed to a reduction of the boost to 34" to remain in place for the entire 2002 season. While technically a reduction by 2" from where engines ended in 2001, lap times and horsepower numbers were still on par and in most cases faster and higher than last year.
Road & Street course qualifying was changed. The race weekend would feature two qualifying sessions, one on Friday and one on Saturday. The fastest driver in each session received one championship point and was guaranteed a front-row start regardless of the results of the other session (the front row guarantee was added at Long Beach). 
For Rounds 1-12, Each session was 60 minutes in length with 45 minutes of guaranteed green flag running. Teams could complete a maximum of 15 green flag laps per session, though causing a yellow/red flag would result in the loss of your fastest lap.
Starting at Montreal for the rest of the season, following numerous events where cars waited until the second half of the session to go out, CART officials changed the 60 minute session to be a 15 minute practice, followed by a 10 minute break, followed by 35 minutes of qualifying with 30 minutes of green-flag running guaranteed.
In the event of a late-race caution, CART officials were allowed to use the red flag to stop the race, clean up the crash, and attempt a green-flag finish.
Starting at the Mid-Ohio round, cars that spun off track into the gravel trap were allowed to be pushed back on track by the safety team and get back into the race as long as there was not other significant race-ending damage to the car. Previously a car stuck in a gravel trap would be ruled out of the event.
Following suit with other Motorsports series, the HANS Device became mandatory at all events, and all pit crew members were required to wear helmets.

Season summary

Schedule 

 Oval/Speedway
 Dedicated road course
 Temporary street circuit

Race results

Final driver standings

Nation's Cup 

 Top result per race counts towards Nation's Cup.

Chassis Constructor's Cup

Engine Manufacturer's Cup

Driver breakdown

See also 
 2002 Toyota Atlantic Championship season
 2002 Indianapolis 500
 2002 Indy Racing League
 2002 Infiniti Pro Series season

Notes

References 
 
 
 
 

Champ Car seasons
CART
CART
 
CART